Ronald Sibanda (born 29 August 1976) is a retired Zimbabwean football midfielder. A Zimbabwe international, he played at the 2000, 2001, 2003, 2004, 2005 and 2006 COSAFA Cup and the 2004 African Cup of Nations.

References 

1976 births
Living people
Zimbabwean footballers
Zimbabwe international footballers
Association football midfielders
Zimbabwean expatriate footballers
Expatriate footballers in Poland
Zimbabwean expatriate sportspeople in Poland
Expatriate footballers in Botswana
Zimbabwean expatriate sportspeople in Botswana
Śląsk Wrocław players
Dynamos F.C. players
Zimbabwe Saints F.C. players
Amazulu F.C. (Zimbabwe) players
Highlanders F.C. players
Njube Sundowns F.C. players
Uniao Flamengo Santos F.C. players